The 1967 Wichita Shockers football team was an American football team that represented Wichita State University as a member of the Missouri Valley Conference during the 1967 NCAA University Division football season. In its first season under head coach Boyd Converse, the team compiled a 2–7–1 record (0–4 against conference opponents), finished in last place out of five teams in the MVC, and was outscored by a total of 201 to 140. The team played its home games at Veterans Field, now known as Cessna Stadium.

Schedule

References

Wichita State
Wichita State Shockers football seasons
Wichita State Shockers football